Oscar Arnold Geier (19 August 1882 – 5 November 1942) was a Swiss bobsledder who competed in the 1930s. He won the silver medal in the two-man event at the 1932 Winter Olympics in Lake Placid.

He was born in Zurich, Switzerland and died in Mountain Lakes, New Jersey.

References
 Bobsleigh two-man Olympic medalists 1932-56 and since 1964 
 DatabaseOlympics.com profile

1882 births
1942 deaths
Sportspeople from Zürich
Swiss male bobsledders
Olympic bobsledders of Switzerland
Bobsledders at the 1932 Winter Olympics
Olympic silver medalists for Switzerland
Swiss emigrants to the United States
Olympic medalists in bobsleigh
Medalists at the 1932 Winter Olympics